Eucalantica powelli is a moth in the family Yponomeutidae. It is found in Costa Rica (high elevations of Cartago Province).

The length of the forewings is 7–10 mm.

Etymology
The species is named after Dr. Jerry A. Powell, director emeritus of the Essig Museum of Entomology, the University of California, Berkeley.

References

Moths described in 2011
Yponomeutidae